The Secret Life of the Zoo is a British documentary programme produced by Blast! Films on behalf of Channel 4. The series is filmed on location at Chester Zoo in the North West of England, and focuses on the behaviour of the animals at the zoo and their relationships with the keepers. The first five series were narrated by Olivia Colman. Actress Tamsin Greig took over narration from the sixth series.

Production
The series gives viewers behind the scenes access to Chester Zoo's 21,000 animals and the people who work there. The zoo's keepers are interviewed in each episode about the various animals and incidents. Head of programmes at Blast!, Nick Hornby explained that as they wanted to tell the story from the animals' perspectives, they did not want the bars of the cages to be in shot, so they placed fixed cameras in the various enclosures. The first series was filmed over 10 months. The series was originally narrated by Olivia Colman. Tamsin Greig took over from October 2018. Ten series have aired between 2016 and 2021. The 8th series started airing in the UK on Channel 4 from 31 October 2019. The ninth series began on 13 February 2020. The tenth series began on 10 August 2021.

Episodes

Season 1 (2016)

Season 2 (2016)

Season 3 (2017)

Season 4 (2017–2018)

Season 5 (2018)

Season 6 (2018)

Season 7 (2019)

Special (2019)

Season 8 (2019)

Season 9 (2020)

Compilation Series (2020)
This series looks back at Chester Zoo over the last five years.

Series 10 (2021)

Reception
In 2018, The Secret Life of the Zoo received a nomination for the British Academy Television Award for Best Feature. However, it lost out to Cruising with Jane McDonald.

Gerard O'Donovan of The Daily Telegraph stated "For those who like their nature full of cute oohs and aahs, rather than red in tooth and claw, The Secret Life of the Zoo gently ticked all the boxes." O'Donovan's colleague Michael Hogan gave the opening episode of the fourth series a positive review, saying that it made him "emotionally invested as the devoted zookeepers." He found the "gently joyful documentary" was made all the more "uplifting" thanks to Colman's narration. He concluded, "it might have been no Blue Planet II but The Secret Life of the Zoo was equally enchanting in its own, more modest way."

References 

https://www.express.co.uk/life-style/life/637748/Channel-4-The-Secret-Life-Of-The-Zoo

http://www.radiotimes.com/tv-programme/e/dy6jfn/the-secret-life-of-the-zoo-episode-guide/

https://www.chesterchronicle.co.uk/news/chester-cheshire-news/chesters-secret-life-zoo-misses-14653634

http://www.chesterzoo.org/global/press-and-media/press-releases/2017/11/secret-life-of-the-zoo-is-back?page=7

http://www.chesterzoo.org/global/press-and-media/press-releases/2018/04/the-secret-life-of-the-zoo-series-five

http://www.thenational.scot/news/16242957.Tonight__39_s_TV__The_Secret_Life_of_the_Zoo__and_The_Doctor_Who_Gave_Up_Drugs/

External links

2016 British television series debuts
2010s British documentary television series
2020s British documentary television series
Channel 4 documentary series
Zoos
English-language television shows
Television series about mammals